Lomer Brisson (December 5, 1916 – January 5, 1981) was a Canadian politician and lawyer. He was elected to the House of Commons of Canada in the 1949 election to represent the riding of Saguenay. He was re-elected in the elections of 1953 and 1957 but defeated in 1958.

External links
 

1916 births
1981 deaths
Liberal Party of Canada MPs
Members of the House of Commons of Canada from Quebec